Tavşanlı is a town and district of Kütahya Province in the Aegean region of Turkey.

Tavşanlı is a typical Aegean town where a government-owned coal mine company attracted thousands of settlers from surrounding cities and villages which made the town reach the population of 101.848 (according to government data from 2021).

The town is also famous for its notable number of jewellery shops and is also famous for popular snack called "leblebi" (roasted chick peas).

Name
Tavşanlı was told to be named after a hunting party held by the Ottoman prince Bayezid I, in which he is said to have hunted 7 rabbits. Thus the name Tavşanlı meaning "the place with rabbits" was given to the area.

Places of interest
 west of Kütahya lies the ancient town of Tavşanlı with a notable 12th-century Seljuq mosque called Ulucami.  to the north in a side valley of the Adronos stream stands a Phrygian rock monument Dikilitaş, a huge volcanic partly smoothed rock with geometric designs.

Notable people
 Mustafa Kalemli, physician and politician
 Kemal Zeytinoğlu, engineer and politician

References

External links
 District governor's official website 
 Pictures from private source of the city

 
Districts of Kütahya Province